The Tokwe Mukosi Dam is a concrete-face rock-fill dam on the Tokwe River, just downstream of its confluence with the Mukosi River, about  south of Masvingo in Masvingo Province, Zimbabwe. The associated hydroelectric power station has a  installed capacity.

Construction on the dam began in June 1998 but stalled in 2008. Salini Impregilo began to finish the dam in 2011. Heavy flooding in February 2014 caused a partial failure on 4 February, on the downstream face of the dam. By late February the dam had not been fully breached but the unplanned rising reservoir behind the dam caused evacuations upstream. Both upstream and downstream, over 20,000 people were evacuated. Construction of the dam was suspended in June 2014 due to a lack of funding. In May 2016 the government released $35 million to Salini Impregilio to enable the Italian contractor resume construction work that stopped two years ago owing to payment problems. The Dam was eventually completed in December 2016 and commissioned in May 2017.

Gallery

References

Dams in Zimbabwe
Concrete-face rock-fill dams
Hydroelectric power stations in Zimbabwe
Dam failures in Africa
Buildings and structures in Masvingo Province
2015 establishments in Zimbabwe
Dams completed in 2016
Energy infrastructure completed in 2016
2014 disasters in Zimbabwe